Alphabet Castle is an educational children's television program produced in the UK and created by Michael Cole. It began in September 1993 with a series of 27 episodes aired on CITV, and ran until December 1995. It had three main characters: King Alpha, Queen Bet, and Gobbledygook, an animated turkey. It starred Stephen Cannon and Joanne Campbell. Music was by Paul Reade.

A total of three series and 65 editions were produced by Michael Cole productions for Carlton Television. Like its near namesake, Alphabet Zoo, a decade earlier, each episode was dedicated to a letter of the alphabet (although this format was dropped for the final series); episodes were generally around 10 minutes in length, and were broadcast in CITV on Wednesday afternoons.

Transmission guide

Series 1: 30  editions from 10 September 1993 to 28 March 1994

Series 2: 20 editions from 7 September 1994 to 1 February  1995

Series 3: 15 editions from 6 September to 13 December 1995

Series 1

References

External links
Alphabet Castle at the Internet Movie Database.

1993 British television series debuts
1995 British television series endings
1990s British children's television series
British children's education television series
British television shows for schools
Reading and literacy television series
ITV children's television shows
Carlton Television
Television series by ITV Studios
British television series with live action and animation
English-language television shows